Lloyd Martin Seibert (May 23, 1889–October 15, 1972) was a Medal of Honor recipient who was awarded the decoration for his valor in the United States Army during World War I.

Biography
Seibert first enlisted in the California National Guard's 7th Infantry in January 1906.  After WWI, he continued to serve on active duty in the U.S. Army.  On 26 August 1937, Master Sergeant Seibert was appointed to the rank of Warrant Officer while assigned to the 1st Cavalry (Mechanized) at Fort Knox, Kentucky.  He would later rise to the rank of Chief Warrant Officer - the rank he held upon retirement from the U.S. Army on 30 June 1944.  

Seibert died in 1972 and is buried at San Francisco National Cemetery.

Medal of Honor Citation

Rank and organization: Sergeant, U.S. Army, Company F, 364th Infantry, 91st Division. Place and date: At Epinonville, France; September 26, 1918. Entered service at: Salinas, California. Birth: May 23, 1889; Caledonia, Michigan. General Orders: War Department, General Orders No. 445 (1919).

Citation:

Suffering from illness, Sergeant Seibert remained with his platoon and led his men with the highest courage and leadership under heavy shell and machinegun fire. With two other soldiers he charged a machinegun emplacement in advance of their company, he himself killing one of the enemy with a shotgun and capturing two others. In this encounter he was wounded, but he nevertheless continued in action, and when a withdrawal was ordered he returned with the last unit, assisting a wounded comrade. Later in the evening he volunteered and carried in wounded until he fainted from exhaustion..

Military Awards
Seibert's military decorations and awards include:

See also

List of Medal of Honor recipients for World War I

References

1889 births
1972 deaths
United States Army Medal of Honor recipients
United States Army officers
United States Army personnel of World War I
People from Kent County, Michigan
Recipients of the Silver Star
World War I recipients of the Medal of Honor
Burials at San Francisco National Cemetery
Military personnel from Michigan